Albasat TV is a television station in Moldova. Its headquarters are in Nisporeni.

It provides news from a number areas of public interest. Albasat TV is a member of Euronova Media Group. The director of Albasat TV is Efim Bardan.

External links 
 Albasat TV continues to be stalked by law enforcers
 Police raid on Albasat TV -- new disclosures

Television channels in Moldova
Euronova Media Group
Mass media in Nisporeni
Television channels and stations established in 1995
1995 establishments in Moldova